European Concert is a live album by American jazz group the Modern Jazz Quartet featuring performances recorded in Sweden in April 1960 and originally released on two consecutive volumes on the Atlantic label.

Reception
The Allmusic review stated "Long considered one of, if not the classic album from the Modern Jazz Quartet, European Concert defines them simultaneously as a recording entity as well as a working band".

Track listing
All compositions by John Lewis except as indicated
 "Django" – 5:32 
 "Bluesology" (Milt Jackson) – 4:39 
 "I Should Care" (Sammy Cahn, Axel Stordahl, Paul Weston) – 5:33 
 "La Ronde" – 3:07 
 "I Remember Clifford" (Benny Golson, Jon Hendricks) – 5:15 
 "Festival Sketch" – 4:40 
 "Vendome" – 2:45 
 "Odds Against Tomorrow" – 6:57 
 "Pyramid (Blues for Junior)" (Ray Brown) – 8:45 
 "It Don't Mean a Thing (If It Ain't Got That Swing)" (Duke Ellington, Irving Mills) – 5:36 
 "Skating in Central Park" – 6:10 
 "The Cylinder" (Jackson) – 6:28 
 "'Round Midnight" (Thelonious Monk) – 3:51 
 "Bags' Groove" (Jackson) – 5:13 
 "I'll Remember April" (Gene de Paul, Patricia Johnston, Don Raye) – 4:54

Tracks 5, 6, 9, 12, 14 and 15 recorded in Stockholm, April 11; tracks 1 – 4, 8, 11 recorded in Gothenburg, April 12; tracks 7, 10, 13 recorded in Stockholm, April 13.

Personnel 
 Milt Jackson – vibraphone
 John Lewis – piano
 Percy Heath – bass
 Connie Kay – drums

References 

Atlantic Records live albums
Modern Jazz Quartet live albums
1960 live albums
Albums produced by Nesuhi Ertegun